Jerry Yang (born 1968) is the co-founder and former CEO of Yahoo! Inc.

Jerry Yang  may also refer to:
Jerry Yang (poker player) (born 1967)
Xiangzhong Yang or Jerry Yang (1959–2009), biotechnology scientist who worked on cloning